Saelele is a commune in Teleorman County, Muntenia, Romania. It is composed of two villages, Pleașov and Saelele. These were part of Lunca Commune until 2004, when they were split off.

References

Communes in Teleorman County
Localities in Muntenia